Anar Ramiz Baghirov (born June 19, 1976, Azerbaijan) is a lawyer and is president of the Azerbaijan Bar Association, a member of the Judicial Legal Council of the Republic of Azerbaijan, a member of Azerbaijan Republic Commission on Combating Corruption, acting dean of the faculty of "Professional Admission and Qualification of Lawyers" under the Justice Academy, and a member of the Board of Education of the Justice Academy. Baghirov holds a Ph.D. degree in law. On 19 May 2015 by decree of the President of the Republic of Azerbaijan, Baghirov was awarded the "Tereggi" (Progress) medal for his endeavors in the activity of the Judges Selection Committee.

Education 
Baghirov holds an LL.B. from Baku State University (1997); LL.M. (Civil Law cum laude) from Baku State University (1999); Ph.D. from Institute of Political-Legal Research under the National Academy of Science of the Republic of Azerbaijan (2006); a doctoral candidate at the Institute of Human Rights under National Academy of Science of the Republic of Azerbaijan (since 2014).

Career 
During 1997-2005, after graduating from Baku State University, Baghirov worked as a legal practitioner in several organizations and agencies. He has been a member of the Bar Association since 2005 and was elected as a member of the Board of the Azerbaijan Bar Association in 2012 and as its President in 2017. In 2019, Baghirov was elected as a member of the Azerbaijan Judicial-Legal Council. Additionally, Baghirov practices as an arbiter at several national and foreign arbitration courts.

Public Activities and Publications 
Baghirov has been a member of the Judges Selection Committee since 2010. He is the acting Dean of "Professional Admission and Qualification of Lawyers" faculty under the Justice Academy and a member of the Board of Education of the Justice Academy since 2016.

He is the Chairman of Azerbaijan Law Reform Centre NGO, co-founder and board member of the Confederation of Azerbaijan Lawyers, a board member of the British-Azerbaijan Law Society, the editor-in-chief of Azerbaijan Lawyer Journal, a member of the South Caucasus Law Journal's editorial board, and a member of the Euroasian Advocacy Journal.

Since 2012, Baghirov has been leading the working group of legal scholars and lawyers for drafting the law on free legal aid and concept paper.

In 2012, he was elected as a member of 'Enhancing Judicial Reform in the Eastern Partnership Countries' working group under "Professional Judicial Systems," an EU-CoE joint project.

He authored a concept paper on "Plea bargaining and its implementation perspectives in Azerbaijan," which was drafted under the CoE "Support to anti-corruption strategy in Azerbaijan" project.

Since March 2018 has been a board member of Union of Bar Associations Turkaphon and Neighboring Countries.

Since 2020 has been a member of Azerbaijan Republic Commission on Combating Corruption

Anar Baghirov is the author of more than 20 academic articles in fields of law such as constitutional law, the legal profession, etc.

Honours 
On May 19, 2015, by decree of the President of the Republic of Azerbaijan, Baghirov was awarded the "Tereggi" (translation: Progress) medal for his endeavors in the activity of the Judges Selection Committee.

As per the decision of the Judicial Legal Council of the Republic of Azerbaijan from December 28, 2019 Anar Baghirov was awarded the Honorary Medal of the Judicial Legal Council.

He received an Honorary Diploma and Doctor Emeritus of the Board of the Azerbaijan Bar Association; an Honorary Diploma of the Union of Association of Judges of the Republic of Azerbaijan; and in 2018 received an Honorary Diploma from Russian Lawyers Guild and from the Federal Chamber of Russian Lawyers.

As per the decision of the Ukrainian National Bar Association (UNBA) from September 17, 2019 Anar Baghirov was awarded the Honorary Medal of the UNBA.

References 

1976 births
21st-century Azerbaijani lawyers
Living people
Baku State University alumni
Jurists from Ganja, Azerbaijan